Larry Banks is a paralympic athlete from the United States competing mainly in category C5 sprint events.

Larry competed in the 100m in both the 1992 and 1996 Summer Paralympics winning the gold medal in a new world record in the 1992 games and being disqualified in the 1996 games.

References

External links
 

Year of birth missing (living people)
Living people
American male sprinters
Paralympic gold medalists for the United States
Paralympic track and field athletes of the United States
Paralympic medalists in athletics (track and field)
Athletes (track and field) at the 1992 Summer Paralympics
Athletes (track and field) at the 1996 Summer Paralympics
Medalists at the 1992 Summer Paralympics